Monica Jackson (16 September 1920 – 7 April 2020) was a Scottish climber and part of the first non-male expedition to scale the Jugal Himal in the Himalayas.

Early life and education 
Monica Jackson was born in Kotagiri and grew up in the Biligirirangan Hills of southern India where her father Ralph Camroux Morris and her mother Heather née Kinloch were coffee planters. Jackson studied sociology and conducted research in the Kollegal region. She wrote a biographical account of her experience growing up in India as well as conducting anthropology research at Kollegal in Going Back.

Climbing career
In 1955, she climbed the Jugal Himal with Elizabeth (Betty) Stark and Evelyn McNicol. They managed to get to the previously unmapped Phurbal Chyachumbu glacier and made it to the 22,000 ft peak on the frontier of Nepal and Tibet. They were the first people to climb it and they named it Gyalgen Peak, after their lead Sherpa, Mingma Gyalgen.

The Gyalgen or Gyalzen or Leonpo Gang East peak is on the border of the Nepalese Bagmati Province and China and it is 6151 m / 20180 feet high.

Writing and other media
In 1957, Jackson wrote the book Tents in the Clouds: the first women's Himalayan expedition her adventures.

She appeared in a BBC documentary, Eye to Eye, on the history of mountaineering where she was filmed climbing Napes Needle with Horace "Rusty" Westmoreland, who was 71 at the time. Napes Needle was an important location, and some believe that the sport of mountaineering started there.

From 2002 to 2003, the Scottish National Portrait Gallery had a show called On Top of the World'' that included pictures of Monica Jackson and her team.

References

External links 
 Recording at SOAS

1920 births
2020 deaths
Female climbers
Scottish sportswomen
Scottish mountain climbers
People from Nilgiris district